Michael James Barron (born 22 December 1974) is a former professional footballer. He retired from playing in May 2008. He was previously the assistant manager at Hartlepool United, where he enjoyed a long and successful playing career.

Football career

Middlesbrough
Barron was born in Chester-le-Street, but started his career at Middlesbrough. Despite spending four years at the club, Barron only made three appearances and found his chances of breaking into the first team limited. Barron looked elsewhere for game time and he was allowed to go on loan to Hartlepool United. Barron made his debut for Hartlepool against Carlisle United and made 14 appearances during his loan spell. Middlesbrough then released Barron and he signed permanently for Hartlepool.

Hartlepool United
After his 3 months on loan at Pools, Barron was persuaded to sign permanently in 1997 under manager Mick Tait, Barron found a role in the middle of a back three, playing as a sweeper, and impressed with his cool and calm nature. He was voted Supporters' Player of the Year in both 1998 and 1999.

Barron moved to right-back under Chris Turner.

Barron was in the Hartlepool side that had three consecutive Football League Third Division play-off semi-final defeats. He was part of the promotion-winning side in 2002-03 but Pools were pipped to the league title by Rushden & Diamonds on the final day of the season. Hartlepool had to beat Rushden to win the title but could only draw.

After promotion, Barron led Pools to the play-offs the following season and he was stretchered off in the second half of the second leg of the semi-final at Bristol City. Pools went on to lose in injury time.

The following year, Pools went one better and Barron led out the Hartlepool team as captain in their League One play-off final in May 2005 against Sheffield Wednesday where a late equaliser eight minutes from time denied Pools their first ever promotion to the Championship, Hartlepool went on to lose in extra-time 4–2 in front of a crowd of 59,808 at the Millennium Stadium.

To celebrate 10 seasons with the club, a series of events were held such as a testimonial dinner with Bobby Robson as guest speaker. Barron could only attend the later stages of the dinner as he was involved in a reserve team match while trying to make his comeback from injury. A testimonial game, at Victoria Park against Leeds United which Hartlepool won 2–1, was also held. During his time on the sidelines, he became a regular special guest commentator on Pools World, the Hartlepool United audio commentary service. Barron signed a new contract in June 2007. He retired at the end of the 2007–08 season which saw Hartlepool finish 15th in League One. He made 374 appearances for Pools, ranked 8th in the all-time list for the club. He scored 3 goals in that time.

Coaching career
During his final playing season with Hartlepool, Micky was a player-coach for the League 1 side as the youth team coach. He kept up this role before being the club's assistant manager to Mick Wadsworth whilst undertaking the role of reserve team coach; John Hewitson was then put in charge of Barron's previous role of youth team coach. He was appointed first-team coach under John Hughes, before he was sacked along with Hughes in May 2013 which allowed Colin Cooper and Craig Hignett to replace to pair later on that month.

He took on first-team duties as caretaker manager on 6 December 2011, following the sacking of previous manager Mick Wadsworth. He was in charge for three games, losing the first two and then beating Oldham 1–0, but reverted to his reserve team duties when Neale Cooper was appointed manager on 28 December 2011.

Cooper resigned as Hartlepool manager on 24 October 2012 with the club sitting bottom of League 1 leaving Barron in charge as caretaker manager until a new manager was appointed. He drew his first game in his second stint as caretaker manager 2–2 against Brentford courtesy of a late own goal, assisted by Ritchie Humphreys.

In September 2020, Barron became assistant manager to former teammate Michael Nelson at Blyth Spartans. Following Nelson's dismissal in November 2021, Barron took temporary charge of Blyth. Alongside his coaching, he works as a teacher at Hermitage Academy in Chester-le-Street. Barron also co-hosts Switch of Play, a podcast of interviews with former Hartlepool players, alongside the club's former media manager Mark Simpson.

Career statistics

Managerial statistics

Honours
Football League Third Division runner-up: 2002–03
League Two runner-up: 2006–07
Hartlepool United Player of the Year: 1997–98, 1998–99

References

External links

Barron's Official Hartlepool United F.C. profile 
Micky Barron profile at In The Mad Crowd
Vital Hartlepool Profile: Mickey Barron 

1974 births
Living people
English footballers
Barron, Michael ark
Association football central defenders
Hartlepool United F.C. players
Middlesbrough F.C. players
Sportspeople from Chester-le-Street
Footballers from County Durham
English Football League players
Hartlepool United F.C. non-playing staff
Hartlepool United F.C. managers
Blyth Spartans A.F.C. managers